Flynderupgård is a former country house in the Espergærde district of Helsingør, Denmark. It is now part of Helsingør Museums dedicated to the non-urban parts of the municipality with its farming communities, farmland, forestry and fishing villages. The outdoor premises comprises traditional breeds of farm animals, cultivation of a five hectares piece of land and a garden, all as it would appear in the 1920s.

History
Flynderupgård was originally a farm but converted into a country house in the beginning of the 19th century. The main building was adapted in its current style in 1915–20.

Exhibition
The museum comprises two large local collections. One of them is a collections of artifacts compiled by teacher at Rspergærde School Arne Meyling in the period between 1954 and the 1970s. The other is a collection of artefacts aelated to fishing which was donated to the museum by architect Per Christiansen.

The main building contains a recreation of a historic grocery store as well as a living room. The museum also arranges special exhibitions several times a year.

Garden
The garden is a recreation of the garden as it would appear in the 1920s. In association with the garden is a sculpture walk as well as several -free-standing sculptures by the sculptor Karl Otto Johansen.

Frilandskulturcentret Flynderupgård
In association to the museum is Frilandskulturcentret Flynderupgård which keeps of farm animals cultivate a five hectares piece of land in the same way as it was done in the 120s. The farm animals are all traditional Danish breeds such as such as Rød Dansk Malkerace cattle Dansk Landrace pige and.

Restaurant
Folkestuen serves traditional Danish as it was prepared in the 1920s.

References

External links

 Official website

Houses in Helsingør Municipality
Museums in the Capital Region of Denmark